Shahebabad  is a village of Comilla District under Brahmanpara Police Station. Keeping Nagarpar at her east, Jiroin at her west, Takoi at her south and Tatera at her North. Previously it was known as Bolda. Soon after Bangladesh period it was renamed to Shahebabad. It has the most popular weekly village market in all the nearest villages.

Around five thousand people are living in this village. Most of them are engaged with local business and farming. It has two big fields where crops are cultivated. A significant number of population of this village are living abroad in the Middle East. The village has a school and a college.

Populated places in Cumilla District